Bangladeshi nationalism is an ideology that promotes the territorial identity of Bangladeshis. The ideology emerged during the late 1970s, popularized by former Bangladesh President Ziaur Rahman. The history of nationalism in the country dates back to the colonial era, when the region started witnessing anti-colonial movements against the British Empire. Soon, a sense of religious nationalism began to emerge which was later revolutionised into ethnolinguistic nationalism. Following independence of Bangladesh in 1971, leaders like Ziaur Rahman began to promote Bangladeshi nationalism which was based on territorial attachment of Bangladeshis. Politically, Bangladeshi nationalism is mainly professed by the center-right and rightist political parties in Bangladesh, led by Bangladesh Nationalist Party.

Background 
The history of development of the territorial and cultural identity in Bangladesh coincided with the origination and growth of Bengali language and literature, predominantly during the period of Bengal Sultanate. The period also reflected religious plurality in the form of harmonious coexistence and cultural assimilation of Hindus and Muslims. The sense of a nation-state further advanced during the rule of the Nawab of Bengal. The concept of nationalism first emerged in the country after the Indian Rebellion of 1857 in the mid 19th century, grounded on the anti-colonial sentiment during the British rule. This nationalism transformed into a new version through the partition of Bengal in 1905, which was strongly opposed by the Hindus in West Bengal and was supported by Muslims of East Bengal. Even though the partition was annulled in 1911, it left a significant and lasting impact on the people, and for the first time sowed the seeds of Hindu-Muslim communal dissonance. It was the beginning of a religious nationalism which eventually led the Muslims to form a separate state.

After the formation of Pakistan, within a short period the idea of religious nationalism began to be replaced by a sense of ethnolinguistic nationalism among the people of then East Pakistan which was primarily caused by the cultural, economic and political discrimination by the West Pakistani elites. The language movement of 1952 was the biggest manifestation of this ethnolinguistic nationalism which later came to be known as Bengali nationalism. This resulted in the demand for regional autonomy for East Pakistan that eventually led to the independence of Bangladesh from Pakistan in 1971.

Genesis 

After independence, the government of Sheikh Mujibur Rahman began to promote Bengali nationalism which was also the basis of Bangladesh's independence from Pakistan. However, the nationalism based on the Bengali ethnicity left the indigenous peoples of Bangladesh dejected. Sheikh Mujib, rejecting the demands of constitutional recognition for the tribal culture and identity, urged upon the indigenous peoples to become Bengalis. Dissatisfied with the acts of the government, the indigenous peoples from Chittagong Hill Tracts formed Parbatya Chattagram Jana Sanghati Samiti, a political party, to demand autonomy.

After the Assassination of Sheikh Mujibur Rahman in 1975, following several coups and counter coups, Ziaur Rahman assumed power in 1976 and declared himself the President of Bangladesh. In an attempt to create a territorial identity in contrast to the ethnolinguistic identity of Bengali nationalism, Ziaur Rahman began to promote the idea of Bangladeshi nationalism. In an interview, Ziaur Rahman tried to give a comprehensive definition of this ideology.

From this time, citizens of Bangladesh came to be known as Bangladeshis instead of Bengali. According to scholars, Zia's main aim to foster this new thought was to distant the country from neighbouring India which had developed extensive ties with the Sheikh Mujib government. Proponents of Bangladeshi nationalism argue that this ideology has an edge over the previous Bengali nationalism because of its territorial appeal which succeeds to include the indigenous peoples of Bangladesh as well as distinguishes the people of Bangladesh from the Bengali people of India. According to Muhammad Ghulam Kabir, "Zia was motivated by the desire to unify the country and to further assert Bangladesh's sovereignty."

Theoretical foundations and salient features 
Traditional nationalist theories form the basis for Bangladeshi nationalism. Burhan Uddin Ahmed states that there are some major theoretical influences of Ernest Renan and Max Weber on the ideology. A major feature of Bangladeshi nationalism is the territorial boundary of Bangladesh, which emphasizes on the protection of the sovereign geographic sanctity of the state against the expansionist and colonialist forces. This territorial concept has been described as an inclusive idea which incorporates the association of all people living within the territory of Bangladesh, regardless their ethnicity or religion.

The notion of sovereignty also relates to the recognition of the liberation war of 1971 without which, states Rahman, Bangladeshi nationalism remains incomplete, as it serves as the foundation of the nation state.

Rahman, while describing Bangladeshi nationalism, also introduced the idea of "peaceful revolutionary economic system" as a key feature of the ideology. He believed that Bangladesh's socialist-influenced economy had been in a poor shape because of "years of colonial-style exploitation". To abate the deteriorating conditions, a revamp of the economic system is required. According to Mubashar Hasan, this new economic system was primarily an "outline for a capitalist system".

Influences of Islam 
While replacing Bengali nationalism with Bangladeshi nationalism as one of the fundamental principles, Ziaur Rahman also removed the principle of secularism, which was also one of the main features of Bengali nationalism and inserted the line "absolute trust and faith on Almighty Allah". Scholars argue that it was a political strategy of Rahman to win the confidence and support of the right wing political parties of Bangladesh. Rahman also intended to strengthen the relations of the country with other Muslim states, especially from the Middle East. The act also helped the country to be differentiated from neighbouring India, a Hindu majority state.

Rahman also promoted religious freedom as a component of Bangladeshi nationalism. Mubashar Hasan states, Rahman's position on religious freedom adheres to the Islamic principle of Tawhid or "the oneness of Allah" and that Rahman's idea of religious freedom is based on "Islamic way, not a liberal secular way". However, Rahman had dismissed theocracy as the governing system for Bangladesh and had opined that "religion should not form the ideological framework of a political party".

After the assassination of Ziaur Rahman in 1981, Hussain Mohammed Ershad, who held the power following the 1982 coup d'état, also actively nurtured Bangladeshi nationalism with high priority on Islam. Ershad had to rely on the support of the right wing political parties as he did not have any support base within both the Awami League and Bangladesh Nationalist Party. In 1988, Ershad went even further by declaring Islam as the state religion.

Shahbagh movement and secular nationalism 
The Shahbagh movement of 2013 started as protests by young bloggers and activists to demand criminal justice against the war crimes perpetrated during the Bangladesh liberation war. The movement has been described as a manifestation of secular cultural nationalism. After an initial criticism on social media for its failure to incorporate the indigenous people into the activities, the movement began to change its slogans, among other things, to make it inclusive of the non-Bengali people.

References

Bibliography

Further reading
 
 
 

Ziaur Rahman
Bangladesh Nationalist Party
Political movements in Bangladesh
Bangladesh Liberation War
Nationalist movements in Asia
Constitution of Bangladesh
Fundamental principles of the constitution of Bangladesh